Anatolia College (Greek: Κολλέγιο Ανατόλια, also known as the American College (Greek: Αμερικάνικο Κολλέγιο), is a private, non-profit, educational institution located in Pylaia, a suburb of Thessaloniki, Greece. The school has five subdivisions: Anatolia Elementary School, Anatolia High School (which includes an International Baccalaureate Diploma Program, IBDP), Pinewood International School, CTY Greece (Center for Talented Youth)  and ACT (the American College of Thessaloniki), the tertiary division of the institution.

As of 2021, it is the only school in Greece with a full boarding program

History

In 1810, the American Board of Commissioners for Foreign Missions was founded in Boston and established the Bebek Seminary outside Constantinople (now Istanbul) in 1840. In 1862, it was transferred to Merzifon, and in 1886, the Anatolia College of Mersovan was founded as a theological seminary for adults, with Charles Tracy as president. The students were principally Greek and Armenian, most coming from outside of Merzifon and boarding at the school, while the faculty was Greek, Armenian, and American. Enrollment soon reached 115 students. In 1893, the girls' school was founded.

In 1920, enrollment stood at 218 students, with an equal number in the girls' school and the campus consisted of more than 40 New England style buildings. Anatolia included a kindergarten, a school for the deaf, high schools for boys and girls, a college-level program, a theological seminary, one of the largest hospitals in Asia Minor, and an orphanage for 2000 orphans.

With help from Eleftherios Venizelos, Anatolia reopened in Thessaloniki in 1924, renting buildings in Harilaou, with 13 students, mostly refugees. Enrollment soon reached 157, while the Mission School for Girls in Thessaloniki became part of Anatolia College Anatolia in 1927. In 1934 the school moved to the newly constructed campus above the city near the village of Pylaia, on the lower slopes of Mt. Hortiatis.

When Greece entered World War II upon the Italian invasion in 1940, the school closed and the campus was used as military hospital. When Germany invaded Greece the campus was taken over by the Germans as general headquarters for the Balkans. The surrender documentations of Greece were signed in the school's main building, Macedonia Hall. In 1944-45 the campus was occupied by the British Army (the last units would not leave until 1949).

At the end of the war Anatolia reopened, as repair of the damaged campus proceeded. The girls' school was moved into temporary quarters on the Anatolia campus after its building on Allatini Street burned. For a number of years the schools remained separate, but co-education was completed by the end of the 1980s. However, the two schools are still administrated by different Deans. The I.B. school, was established in 1998. A school for management assistants was established in 1964 and closed early in the 21st Century.

In 1981, Anatolia re-established post-secondary education (its original mission) with the founding of the School of Business Administration and Liberal Arts (SBALA), later renamed American College of Thessaloniki (ACT).

Divisions

ACT – American College of Thessaloniki (Tertiary Division)

ACT (American College of Thessaloniki) is the tertiary division of Anatolia College.

ACT has been granted a license by the Greek government to operate as a private post-secondary educational institution (“College”).

ACT's undergraduate curriculum leads to bachelor's degrees in Business (with 5 concentrations), Computer Science, Business Computing, Political Science & International Relations, English (with 2 concentrations), and Psychology. It also offers a Master of Science (MS) in Industrial/Organizational Psychology, a Master of Science (MS) in Hospitality and Tourism Management, and a Master in Business Administration (MBA) with concentrations in Banking & Finance, Entrepreneurship, Management, and Marketing in the Digital Era.

ACT offers a need and merit-based financial aid program.

Anatolia High School (Secondary School) 
The secondary division of Anatolia is the original element of this educational institution. Anatolia is organized in accordance with Greek law and grants the Greek Apolytirio (the Greek high school diploma) by meeting the requirements established by the Greek Ministry of Education, while students enrolled in the I.B. program receive the I.B. Certificate. Entrance to the regular high school and IB program is based on examinations and previous school records.

Anatolia High School offers the MYP program from 7th to 10th grade. MYP provides a framework of learning that encourages students to become creative, critical and reflective thinkers. The MYP emphasizes intellectual challenge, encouraging students to make connections between their studies in traditional subjects and the real world.

With the exception of courses in English, Art and Computers, the Greek high school curriculum is taught in Greek, while all IBDP courses are taught in English except Greek Literature that is taught in Greek. Each gymnasium (grades 7–9) and lyceum (grades 10–12) has its own Dean and Deputy Dean, and the IBDP program has its own Director. The High School as a whole is overseen by the Vice President for Secondary Education.

IBDP (International Baccalaureate Diploma Programme)
Anatolia College's high school, apart from the Greek Ministry of Education Program, hosts an  International Baccauleureate Diploma Program, the IBDP, for the two final years of high school. Entrance is competitive, and upon entrance, students have to select a subject from each of the six fields of study the IB offers: Two languages, one primary and one secondary, one Mathematics course out of the three levels that are offered, Science, Social Sciences, and Arts. In addition to the six subjects, (three of which are in the Standard Level, and three of which are in the Higher Level), it is compulsory for each student to compose an Extended Essay, a 4000 word project, in the Subject of his/her choice, as well as take part in a Theory of Knowledge Course.

Students wishing to sit for the IBDP, can receive up to 7 point per subject, and a total of 3 points from Theory of Knowledge and the Extended Essay.  Grades are given in total out of 45 points.

Anatolia Elementary School (Elementary School) 
Anatolia Elementary School was established in 2004 and formally opened in 2005, and includes a kindergarten and an elementary school. The enrollment is 450 students (PreK-6).

Notable alumni

 Yiannis Boutaris (class of 1960), Mayor of Thessaloniki (2011-2019).
 Raphael Demos (class of 1910, Bachelor A.B.), Professor of philosophy at Harvard University.
 Gikas Hardouvelis (class of 1973), Minister of Finance (2014-2015).
 Harris Mylonas (class of 1996), Associate Professor of Political Science at George Washington University and editor-in-chief of Nationalities Papers.
 Vasilis Tsivilikas (class of 1961), was a Greek comedy actor with significant appearances in the Greek film industry, television and especially theater.
 Amedeo Odoni (class of 1961), Professor of Aeronautics and Astronautics, Professor of Civil and Environmental Engineering at MIT.
 Auguste Corteau (class of 1996), pen name of Petros Hadjopoulos, famous Greek author.
 Alecos Papadatos (class of 1977), is a comic book writer and illustrator, best known as the artist of Logicomix, a graphic novel written by Apostolos Doxiadis and Christos Papadimitriou. Logicomix was the No. 1 New York Times Best Seller Paperback Graphic Book of October 18, 2009.

Faculty
There are 230 faculty members at Anatolia College, divided among the three divisions as follows: Elementary School (32), High School (156), and ACT (42). The majority of the faculty members are Greek, plus British, American, dual nationals and other European nationalities. The student to teacher ratio is 1:9 throughout the entire institution. The administration of the school is Greek, with some members having dual citizenship.

Governance
Anatolia College is governed by a Board of Trustees with headquarters in Boston, Massachusetts. Approximately half of the Trustees reside in the New England region while most of the remainder represent other areas of the United States. Several Trustees are Greek residing in Greece. The Trustees maintain an office in Boston to conduct fund-raising and otherwise serve the college.

Presidents
Anatolia has had 11 presidents, the first 10 from the United States. The current president is Dr. Panos Vlahos, who is the first Greek president in the history of the institution. The longest-lasting president of Anatolia was Charles Tracy, whose tenure lasted for 26 years, followed closely by Dr. William McGrew, who was president for 25 years. The shortest presidency was that of Joseph Kennedy, who was president for 3 years.

CTY Greece at Anatolia College (Center for Talented Youth) 

Anatolia College, Johns Hopkins University and the Stavros Niarchos Foundation have partnered to create the "Center for Talented Youth Greece at Anatolia College", a part of Johns Hopkins's CTY program already active for over 30 years in 120 countries.

The goal of the program is to identify and educate children of 5 to 16 years old that have special talents or capabilities, achieve high scores in school and are dedicated to learning beyond the limits of the regular educational system.

The program began in 2014 with the setting in operation a summer camp for children of 12 to 15, who will study subjects at a university level in various fields, such as, but not limited to, game theory. The Stavros Niarchos Foundation will fund the participation of students in the program for the first 3 years of its operation.

There is an expansion of the program scheduled for the future concerning all-year and online courses.

Εxtracurricular activities

Clubs
Anatolia College students are given a choice of over 70 clubs to join.  Many students have earned national and international awards through participation in the school clubs, such as the Anatolia College Model United Nations, which is hosted annually, the Drama Club, which performs English musicals, and the Greek Drama Club, mostly performing comedies or ancient Greek plays. The college also has a presence at the Youth Parliament of Greece.

Sports tournaments
The Aegean Tournament is hosted every year at Anatolia College. Students from schools all over Greece attend and compete in  sports. Field Day is also hosted once a year, and students of Anatolia College are given the opportunity to compete in sports, dance competitions and other such events. The school's sports teams have won awards on a national level.

See also
 Anatolia College in Merzifon
 List of schools in Greece
 Robert College
 Koc School

References

 Bir Amerikan Misyonerinin Merzifon Amerikan Koleji Hatiralari (Memories of an American Missionary at the Merzifon American College), George E. White, Translated by Cem Tarık Yüksel, Enderun Kitapevi, İstanbul-1995. 
 Adventuring With Anatolia College, George E. White, Herald-Register Publishing Company, Grinnell, Iowa, March 1940

External links
 Anatolia College website
 Anatolia alumni website
 ACMUN website
 The Anatolian publication list
 The Morning Cometh: 45 years with Anatolia College
 Anatolia College report from 1902, giving insight to the school while in Merzifon
 Ciao Net (Columbia International Affairs Online) Some Remarks on Alevi Responses to the Missionaries in Eastern Anatolia (19th-20th cc.) by Hans-Lukas Kieser, University of Basel, Switzerland
 "Adventuring With Anatolia College" by Dr. George E. White (HTML) posted by George Baloglou, State University of New York, College at Oswego
 Brief History of The American College of Thessaloniki
 Ottoman Official Attitudes Towards American Missionaries by Cagri Erhan, Department of International Relations, Ankara University, Ankara, Turkey (research.yale.edu - YCIAS Working Papers Database)

Educational institutions established in 1886
International schools in Thessaloniki
American international schools in Greece
International Baccalaureate schools in Greece
1886 establishments in the Ottoman Empire 
1924 establishments in Greece